Neodiapsida is a clade, or major branch, of the reptilian family tree, typically defined as including all diapsids apart from some early primitive types known as the araeoscelidians. Modern reptiles and birds belong to the neodiapsid subclade Sauria.

The oldest known neodiapsid is generally considered to be Orovenator from the Early Permian (Cisuralian) of North America.

Basal-non saurian neodiaspids were ancestrally lizard-like, but basal Permian neodiapsids also include specialised swimming forms (Hovasaurus) the gliding lizard-like Weigeltisauridae, as well as the Triassic chameleon-like drepanosaurs. The position of the highly derived Mesozoic marine reptile groups Thalattosauria, Ichthyosauromorpha and Sauropterygia within Neodiapsida is uncertain, and they may lie within Sauria.

Classification 
The clade Neodiapsida was given a phylogenetic definition by Laurin in 1991. He defined it as the branch-based clade containing all animals more closely related to "Younginiformes" (later, more specifically, emended to Youngina capensis) than to Petrolacosaurus. The cladogram presented here illustrates the "family tree" of reptiles, and follows a simplified version of the relationships found by M.S. Lee, in 2013. All genetic studies have supported the hypothesis that turtles are diapsid reptiles; some have placed turtles within archosauromorpha, or, more commonly, as a sister group to extant archosaurs. though a few have recovered turtles as lepidosauromorphs instead. The cladogram below used a combination of genetic (molecular) and fossil (morphological) data to obtain its results.

This second cladogram is based on the 2017 study by Pritchard and Nesbiit.

References

 Callaway, J.M. (1997), Ichthyosauria: Introduction, in JM Callaway & EL Nicholls (eds.), Ancient Marine Reptiles. Academic Press, pp. 3–16.
 Laurin, Michel and Gauthier, Jacques A. (2000) Autapomorphies of Diapsid Clades

External links
 Eureptilia: Neodiapsida
 Neodiapsida cladogram

 
Reptile taxonomy
Guadalupian first appearances
Extant Permian first appearances
Taxa named by Michael Benton